WCOE (96.7 FM) is a radio station licensed to La Porte, Indiana, United States. The station airs a country music format and is owned by Spoon River Media, LLC.

References

External links

COE
Country radio stations in the United States